Devereaux Reginald Mytton (28 October 1924 – 9 May 1989) was an Australian competitive sailor and Olympic medalist. He won a bronze medal in the 5.5 Metre class at the 1956 Summer Olympics in Melbourne.

References

1924 births
1989 deaths
Australian male sailors (sport)
Sailors at the 1956 Summer Olympics – 5.5 Metre
Olympic sailors of Australia
Olympic bronze medalists for Australia
Olympic medalists in sailing

Medalists at the 1956 Summer Olympics
20th-century Australian people